Reisterstown is an unincorporated community and census-designated place in Baltimore County, Maryland, United States. As of the 2010 census, it had a population of 25,968.

Founded by German immigrant John Reister in 1758, Reisterstown is located to the northwest of Baltimore. Though it is older than the surrounding areas, it now serves primarily as a residential suburb of Baltimore. The center is designated the Reisterstown Historic District and listed on the National Register of Historic Places in 1979. Also listed are the Montrose Mansion and Chapel and St. Michael's Church.

Just outside the community, to its north, is the small military reservation of Camp Fretterd, which serves as a training site for the Maryland Army National Guard and Air Guard. The Maryland Defense Force is also headquartered at Camp Fretterd.

History

Reister's Town
John Reister purchased a  tract of land, which he called "Reister's Desire", along the Conewago Road on March 2, 1758. He built a tavern on the site, providing food, drink and lodging for travelers. Other businesses serving travelers soon followed, creating the settlement known as Reister's Town, and eventually Reisterstown. With the purchase in 1763 of another  adjoining the original property, Reister began developing both sides of Conewago Road, later renamed Reisterstown Road.

Franklin Academy
In 1764, John Reister purchased a three-quarter acre lot, which he named Church Hill, as a site for the community's first church, a small building constructed of logs. Funded and built by the Lutheran community, the church was free to all denominations. The building also served as a school house, a secondary function typical of churches at that time.

The town raised money with a public subscription and replaced the log building with a brick school building in 1824, named Franklin Academy in honor of Benjamin Franklin. A cupola was added to the school in 1826. Franklin Academy became the first public high school in the county in 1874 and one of the earliest schools to join the Baltimore County school system.

The former Franklin Academy was converted into a public library in the early 1900s.  It still stands beside the Reisterstown Community Cemetery, across the street from the present-day Franklin Middle School. Franklin Academy's cupola, known as the Franklin Bell, is in front of Franklin High School.

Education

Public schools 
 Elementary: 	Franklin, Cedarmere, Glyndon, Reisterstown, Timber Grove, and Chatsworth. All are grades K–5. Franklin, Cedarmere, Glyndon, and Reisterstown also provide preschool education.
 Middle: 	Franklin (Grades 6–8)
 High:		Franklin (Grades 9–12)

Private schools 
 Hannah More School (Grades 9–12)
 Sacred Heart Parochial School (Grades K–8 and preschool)

Town recreation 
The Reisterstown Area Recreation Council (RRC) organizes athletic and recreational activities for the Reisterstown area.  Its athletic programs included the following during 2010.

Athletics

All sports are split up into appropriate age groups for better match ups between skill levels. The RRC also holds adult leagues for boxing, volleyball, men's basketball, and men's 40+ basketball.

Other activities
Reisterstown has two annual festivals, organized with help from the RRC.
 The Bloomin' ArtsFest, at the Franklin Middle School grounds, held in May.
 The Reisterstown Festival, at Hannah More Park, held in September.     http://reisterstownfest.com/

Music on Main Street 
Every year the Reisterstown Improvement Association organizes free concerts on Friday nights through the late spring to early fall. All concerts are held at the Franklin Middle School (10 Cockeys Mill Road, Reisterstown MD). Lineup for 2022:

https://www.reisterstown.com/music-on-main-street/

Reisterstown Farmers Market 
The 2022 Reisterstown Farmers Market is held Sundays June 5th through October 30th from 9am – 1pm at Franklin Middle School Main Street lawn. (10 Cockeys Mill Road, Reisterstown MD)    https://www.reisterstown.com/farmers-market/

Geography 
According to the U.S. Census Bureau, the Reisterstown CDP occupies , all land.

The community stretches along Reisterstown Road (Maryland Route 140) and the Northwestern Expressway (Interstate 795) just north of Owings Mills. Its northern boundary lies near the junction of MD-140 and Hanover Pike (MD-30), which heads north towards Hampstead. MD-140 passes the northern end of I-795 and continues northwest as Westminster Pike, heading towards Finksburg and Westminster. The community of Glyndon is located adjacent to the northern portion of Reisterstown along Butler Road (MD-128), which connects Reisterstown with the Baltimore-Harrisburg Expressway (Interstate 83). To the east of Reisterstown is the community of Worthington, located around Greenspring Avenue and Park Heights Avenue (MD-129). To the west of Reisterstown is Liberty Reservoir.

Transportation

Roads
Major roads in the Reisterstown area include:
Butler Road (MD-128)
Bond Avenue
Cockeys Mill Road
Central Avenue
Deer Park Road
Dover Road
Franklin Boulevard
Hanover Pike (MD-30)
Ivy Mill Road
Main Street (MD-140)
Northwest Expressway (I-795), an interstate highway that connects the community to the Baltimore Beltway
Red Run Boulevard
Reisterstown Road (MD-140), the central road and the major transportation artery of the town
Sacred Heart Lane (formerly MD-127)
Westminster Pike (MD-140)
Worthington Avenue
Berrymans Lane

Demographics 

The census of 2010 reported that there were 25,968 people and 6,740 families residing in the Reisterstown census-designated place (CDP), living in 10,133 of available housing units. The racial makeup of the CDP was 57.2% White, 29.3% African American, 0.4% Native American, 6.3% Asian, 0.1% Pacific Islander, 3.7% from other races, and 3.2% from two or more races. Hispanic or Latino of any race were 8.9% of the population.

Of the community's 10,133 households, 33.0% had children under 18 years, 44.5% were married couples living together, 17.0% had a female householder with no husband present, and 33.5% were non-families. Individuals living alone occupied 81.2% of the non-family households; 30.4% of these individuals were 65 years of age or older. The average household size was 2.54 and the average family size was 3.07.

In the CDP, the population was spread out, with 27.1% under the age of 20, 6.5% from 20 to 25, 29.6% from 25 to 44, 26.2% from 45 to 64, and 10.5% who were 65 years of age or older. The median age was 36.2 years.

In the 2009-2013 American Community Survey 5-Year Estimates, the median income for a household in the CDP was $60,201, and the median income for a family was $65,911. The per capita income for the CDP was $72,714. About 11.6% of families and 14.4% of the population were below the poverty line, including 20.1% of those under age 18 and 6.6%% of those age 65 or over.

As of July, 2019, Reisterstown has become a majority minority community. Non-Hispanic whites are a plurality, constituting 45% of the population.

References

External links

 , including photo from 2006, at Maryland Historical Trust
 Photo of Franklin Middle School. Portfolio Historic Architecture. Rubeling & Associates.
 Reisterstown.com. Local Events Calendar; Shopping, Dining and Business Directory, maintained by the Reisterstown Improvement Association

 
Census-designated places in Baltimore County, Maryland
Census-designated places in Maryland
Populated places established in 1758
1758 establishments in Maryland